A blunt instrument is any solid object used as a weapon, which damages its target by applying direct mechanical force, and has no penetrating point or edge, or is wielded so that the point or edge is not the part of the weapon that inflicts the injury. Blunt instruments may be contrasted with edged weapons, which inflict injury by cutting or stabbing, or projectile weapons, where the projectiles, such as bullets or arrows, are accelerated to a damaging speed.

Blunt instruments typically inflict blunt force trauma, causing bruising, fractures and other internal bleeding. Depending on the parts of the body attacked, organs may be ruptured or otherwise damaged. Attacks with a blunt instrument may be fatal.

Some sorts of blunt instruments are very readily available, and often figure in crime cases.  Examples of blunt instruments include:

 Personal implements such as walking sticks
 Tools such as hammers, crowbars, pipe wrenches, or heftier flashlights such as the Maglite or Kel-Lite.
 Parts of tools, such as pickaxe handles
 Sports equipment such as cricket bat or baseball bats, hockey sticks, pool cues, golf clubs, etc.
 Weapons such as batonss, bâton français, axes, spears (using the haft), or guns (see firearm as a blunt weapon)
 Other items, such as millwall bricks or tree branches

See also

List of melee weapons
Melee weapon

References

Violence
Blunt weapons
Legal terminology